Penicillium araracuarense is a fungus species of the genus of Penicillium  which was isolated from soil from the Colombian Amazon forest

See also
List of Penicillium species

References 

araracuarense
Fungi described in 2011